Myriam Fox-Jerusalmi (born 24 October 1961 in Marseille) is a French slalom canoeist who competed at the international level from 1979 to 1996.

Career
Competing in two Summer Olympics, she won a bronze medal in the K1 event in Atlanta in 1996.

Fox-Jerusalmi also won ten medals at the ICF Canoe Slalom World Championships with eight golds (K1: 1989, 1993; K1 team: 1983, 1985, 1989, 1991, 1993, 1995) and two silvers (K1: 1987; K1 team: 1987).

She won the overall World Cup title three consecutive times between 1989 and 1991.

In 2018, she won the Coach of the Year at the AIS Sport Performance Awards.

World Cup individual podiums

Personal life

Her husband, Richard, competed for Great Britain in slalom canoeing, and later coached Australia in the same event. Fox-Jerusalmi's husband is also an executive officer in the International Canoe Federation. Their daughter, Jessica Fox won gold in the girls' K1 slalom event at the 2010 Summer Youth Olympics in Singapore, four Olympic medals, and sixteen World Championship medals as of 2022. Competing for Australia in the 2012 Olympics, Jessica won the K1 slalom silver medal. Her younger daughter Noemie Fox is also a slalom canoeist. Myriam's sister-in-law Rachel Crosbee also competed in canoe slalom.

Fox-Jerusalmi is Jewish.

See also
 List of select Jewish canoers

References

External links
 
 
 
 

1961 births
French emigrants to Australia
Canoeists at the 1992 Summer Olympics
Canoeists at the 1996 Summer Olympics
French female canoeists
Jewish French sportspeople
Living people
Olympic canoeists of France
Olympic bronze medalists for France
Olympic medalists in canoeing
Medalists at the 1996 Summer Olympics
Sportspeople from Marseille